Mil Ke Bhi Hum Na Mile is a 2012 Pakistani drama serial based on the novel "Mahi Mahi Kook Di Mein" by "Huma Kokab Bukhari", directed by Faisal Bukhari and written by Irfan Mughal. It aired on Geo Entertainment, starring Natasha Ali, Babar Ali, Nadeem Baig, Asad Malik, Imran Bukhari, Maira Khan, Sobia Khan, Kiran Tabeir, Tauqeer Ahmed Paul and Zainab Jamil.

Cast

Main characters
 Nadeem Baig as Pir Syed Jalal-uddin Shah: a feudal lord, father of Mehru, Rajab, Zaibi and Haider. He considers marriage of women of her family as a loss of pride and distribution of wealth (2012–2013)
 Imran Bukhari as  
Syed Haider Ali Shah: younger son of Shah G and Nazri, kind-hearted towards the village people and stands against the cruelties of Rajab. He falls in love with Zareena, a girl of a lower status then his family (2012–2013)
Abdullah: son of Haider and Fauzia, he falls in love with her university mate, Bano, and starts dating her (2013)
 Natasha Ali as Zareena aka Gauri: daughter of Molvi Naimatullah and Nail Bakht, she is a simple yet beautiful woman and falls in love with Haider (2012–2013)
 Asad Malik as Syed Rajab Ali Shah: heir to Shah G and a cruel, dominant man. His mindset towards marriage of women is similar to that of his father yet he uses women for his joy and pleasure (2012–2013)
 Zara Akbar as Syeda Mehrunnisa aka Mehru: eldest daughter of Shah G and Nazri, victim of a conventional mindset and rituals of Shah G and Rajab (2012–2013)
 Saria Asghar Ansari as Syeda Zebunnisa aka Zebi: younger daughter of Shah G and Nazri, victim of a conventional mindset and rituals of Shah G and Rajab. She falls in love with Achoo, a poor horse rider (2012–2013)
 Babar Ali as Qadir aka Achoo: a poor horse rider who belongs to a family of lower status comparatively to the family of Zaibi, and has fallen in love with her (2012–2013)
 Maira Khan (Jr)/ Kinza Malik as Yasmeen: Noor-uddin's eldest daughter, wife of Rajab. Kinza Malik portrayed the character after generation leap (2012–2013)
Sobia Khan as Reshma: Rajab and Zareena's daughter. Rajab vowed to marry her to Abdullah, but only if Haider marries off his daughters, Zara and Zainab to Khadim and Mukarram (2013)
Kiran Tabeir as Mahbano aka Bano: Razia's daughter, love-interest of Abdullah (2013)
Zainab Jamil as Zainab aka Zainy: Haider and Fauzia's younger daughter (2013)
Ash Khan as Zara: Haider and Fauzia's elder daughter, love-interest of Shahaan (2013)

Supporting characters
 Saba Faisal as Nazri Begum: wife of Shah G, mother of Mehru, Rajab, Zaibi and Haider (2012–2013)
 Saima Saleem as Razia: Zareena's sister (2012–2013)
 Khalid Butt as Molvi Naimatullah: Razia and Zareena father (2012–2013)
 Narjis Amir as Fauzia: Yasmeen's sister, Haider's wife (2012–2013)
 Shaista Jabeen as Naik Bakht: Razia and Zareena mother (2012–2013)
 Imran Ahmed as Syed Noor-uddin: younger brother of Shah G and Yasmeen, Fauzia father (2012–2013)
 Raheela Agha as Sualeha: Noor-uddin wife and Yasmeen, Fauzia mother (2012–2013)
 Rasheed Ali as Munshi Fazal Deen: accountant, looking after income from agricultural lands of Shah G, Achoo's father (2012–2013)
 Naghma as Hajra; Achoo's mother (2012–2013)
 Beena Chaudhary as Hameedan: Maid at Shah G Haveli, helps Zaibi to meet Achoo (2012–2013)
 Tauqeer Ahmed Paul as Sibte Hussain Shah: youngest son of Rajab and Yasmeen, living away from village for studies. He falls in love with Zainab unaware of the fact that she's her cousin (2013)
 Kamran Mujahid as Khadim Hussain: elder son of Rajab and Yasmeen, shallow, ruthless and narrow-minded man (2013)
 Fajar Ali as Neha: Bano's friend, she have feelings for James however he doesn't like her (2013)
 Sheraz Sikandar as Shahaan: family-friend of Zara and Zainab, having feelings for Zara (2013)
 Agha Shiraz as Mukarram Hussain Shah
 Arsalan Raja as Imdaad Hussain Shah
 Manan Butt as James: a painter
 Shiba Butt as Mariam/Kristi: care taker of Zara and Zainab (2013)
 Rabia Tabassum as Bi Jaan: guardian mother of Abdullah, Zara and Zainab after Fauzia's death (2013)
 Rana Aftab as Shah Jahan: a businessman, Shahaan's father, Haider's friend (2013)

Minor character
 Qandeel Baloch as Sonu (2012)

Production

Casting
The serial featured veteran Nadeem Baig in a prominent role joined by newcomers Imran Bukhari and Natasha Ali in lead roles. Asad Malik and Maira Khan portrayed negative characters. Babar Ali and Saira Asghar paired up as a couple in the soap but their characters died and they bid adieu to the show after 52 episodes; however they did appear in flashbacks later.

The serial took a generation leap after 106 episodes and the entire cast was changed except for Imran and Asad who reprised their roles as Haider and Rajab, respectively. Kinza Malik replaced Maira Khan as Yasmeen. The new faces introduced were Sobia Khan, Tauqeer Ahmed Paul, Zainab Jamil, Sheraz Sikandar, Kiran Tabeir, Mannan Butt, Arsalan Raja, Fajar Ali, Ash Khan.

Location
The shooting of the soap took place in a village in Punjab, Pakistan. Part of the serial was also filmed in Murree. The university scenes were filmed in COMSAT Islamabad.

References

External links 
 

2012 Pakistani television series debuts
2013 Pakistani television series debuts
Pakistani television dramas based on novels
Geo TV original programming
Pakistani drama television series
Urdu-language television shows